The Amato I Cabinet was the 49th cabinet of the Italian Republic, and the first cabinet of the XI Legislature. It held office from 28 June 1992 until 28 April 1993, a total of 304 days, or 10 months.

The cabinet obtained the confidence of the Senate on 2 July 1992 with 173 votes in favour and 140 against. It obtained the confidence of the Chamber of Deputies on 4 July  1992 with 330 votes in favour, 280 against and 2 abstentions. The number of the ministries were reduced to 24 from 32. The government resigned on 22 April 1993.

Party breakdown

Beginning of term
 Italian Socialist Party (PSI): Prime minister, 7 ministers, 11 undersecretaries
 Christian Democracy (DC): 12 ministers, 18 undersecretaries
 Italian Liberal Party (PLI): 2 ministers, 3 undersecretaries
 Italian Democratic Socialist Party (PSDI): 2 ministers, 3 undersecretaries
 Independents: 2 ministers

End of term
 Italian Socialist Party (PSI): Prime minister, 3 ministers, 11 undersecretaries 
 Christian Democracy (DC): 13 ministers, 18 undersecretaries
 Italian Liberal Party (PLI): 2 ministers, 3 undersecretaries 
 Italian Democratic Socialist Party (PSDI): 2 ministers, 3 undersecretaries 
 Independents: 3 ministers

Composition

|}

Notes

Italian governments
1992 establishments in Italy
1993 disestablishments in Italy
Cabinets established in 1992
Cabinets disestablished in 1993